Animalia is the taxonomic kingdom comprising all animals.

Animalia may also refer to:

 Animalia (book), a 1986 children's book by Graeme Base
 Animalia (TV series), an Australian children's program based on the book

See also
Animal (disambiguation)
Animality (disambiguation)